Zavarzin is a Russian masculine surname, its feminine counterpart is Zavarzina. Notable people with the surname include:

Alena Zavarzina (born 1989), Russian snowboarder
Alexei Alexeivich Zavarzin (1886–1945), Soviet histologist and cell biologist
Viktor Zavarzin (born 1948), Russian general and politician

Russian-language surnames